Route 94 is a numbered state highway running  in Rhode Island. Route 94's southern terminus is at Route 14 and Route 102 in Foster and the northern terminus is at U.S. Route 44 (US 44) in Chepachet.

Route description
Route 94 takes the following route through the State:
Foster: ; Route 14/Route 102 to Glocester town line
Foster Center Road and Mount Hygeia Road
Chepachet (Town of Glocester): ; Foster town line to US 44
Reynolds Road

Major intersections

References

External links

2019 Highway Map, Rhode Island

094
Transportation in Providence County, Rhode Island
Foster, Rhode Island
Glocester, Rhode Island